Fendley is a surname. It is similar to Findley and Findlay.

List of people with the surname 
 Jake Fendley (1929–2002), American basketball player
 John Fendley, British television presenter
 Paul Fendley, Canadian ice hockey player

See also 
 Fendley Glacier
 Bud Fendley House

English-language surnames
Surnames of English origin
Surnames of British Isles origin